The Tempests or Tempests may refer to:

 The Tempests (book) (1920), by Kahlil Gibran
 The Tempests (band), an American classic rock band
 The Tempests, original name of The Royals, a Jamaican roots reggae vocal group
 "Tempests" (The Outer Limits), an episode of The Outer Limits